Chahkin (also Romanized as Chāhkīn; also known as Chāh Gīn and Chākīn) is a village in Jorjafak Rural District, in the Central District of Zarand County, Kerman Province, Iran. At the 2006 census, its population was 121, in 40 families.

References 

Populated places in Zarand County